Scottsfield Airpark  is a small airfield located about  northwest of Fredericton, New Brunswick, Canada beside the Saint John River.

External links
Page about this airport on COPA's Places to Fly airport directory

References

Registered aerodromes in New Brunswick
Transport in York County, New Brunswick
Buildings and structures in York County, New Brunswick